Huangdao District and Xihai'an New Area, also known as Qingdao West Coast is a district and a state-level new area of Qingdao, Shandong, China, located southwest and west of the main urban area of the city on the western shore of Jiaozhou Bay. It was identical to Qingdao Economic and Technological Development Zone (QETDZ), which was launched in 1985 after the zone was merged with Huangdao District and set up the Free Trade Zone in 1992. In December 2012, Jiaonan, a county-level city in Qingdao was merged into Huangdao District.

The pillar industries engaged in the zone include electronics, household electric appliances, building materials, petrochemicals, machinery and pharmaceutical drugs. It is connected via the Jiaozhou Bay Bridge.

In mid 2018, the Ministry of Civil Affairs approved the consolidation of Huangdao District Government and Xihai'an New Area Government into a single governing body, which became the fourth administrative state-level new areas after Pudong of Shanghai; Binhai of Tianjin; and Nansha of Guangzhou. The population was 1.71 million in 2014.

Administrative divisions 

Huangdao is divided into 12 subdistricts and 10 more rural towns; the latter half of the current subdistricts and all towns were ceded from Jiaonan City.

 Subdistricts (街道) 

 Towns (镇)

Transport

China Railway
Qingdao West railway station

Qingdao Metro
Line 1
Line 6 (under construction)
Line 13

Climate

References

External links 
 Huangdao District / Xihai'an New Area Government official website 

Populated places established in 1985
Geography of Qingdao
New areas (China)
1985 establishments in China
County-level divisions of Shandong
Districts of China